This is a list of the extreme points of Oceania.

 Northernmost point – Kure Atoll, United States (28°25′N)
 Southernmost point – Bishop and Clerk Islets, Australia (55°07′S)
 Westernmost point – Dirk Hartog Island, Australia (112°55′E)
 Easternmost point – Easter Island, Chile (109°13′W)
 Lowest point on land – Lake Eyre, Australia: 
 Highest point – Puncak Jaya, Indonesia:  
 Deepest sea – Challenger Deep:

See also
Extreme points of Earth
List of extreme points of Australia
List of extreme points of New Zealand

 
Oceania
Extreme points of New Zealand
Geography of Oceania